The 1960 Michigan State Spartans football team represented Michigan State University in the 1960 Big Ten Conference football season. In their seventh season under head coach Duffy Daugherty, the Spartans compiled a 6–2–1 overall record (4–2 against Big Ten opponents), finished in fourth place in the Big Ten Conference, and were ranked No. 15 in the final AP Poll.

Halfback Herb Adderly was selected by the United Press International as a first-team player on the 1960 All-Big Ten Conference football team.

The 1960 Spartans won all three of their annual rivalry games. In the annual Indiana–Michigan State football rivalry game, the Spartans defeated the Hoosiers by a 35 to 0 score. In the Notre Dame rivalry game, the Spartans defeated the Fighting Irish by a 21 to 0 score. And, in the annual Michigan–Michigan State football rivalry game, the Spartans defeated the Wolverines by a 24 to 17 score. In non-conference play, the Spartans tied Pittsburgh, 7–7, and defeated Detroit, 43–15.

Schedule

Personnel

References

Michigan State
Michigan State Spartans football seasons
Michigan State Spartans football